Mattawa is an incorporated city in Grant County, Washington, United States. The population was 3,335 at the 2020 census.

History

The town of Mattawa was originally platted in 1909 by E. and Eva Campbell, but was not incorporated at that time. With the construction of nearby Priest Rapids Dam and Wanapum Dam, the town boomed with construction workers. Mattawa was officially incorporated on June 3, 1958. The Port of Mattawa was also established in 1958. Mattawa is also home to the first straw bale library in the United States. On December 3, 2009, the City of Mattawa became a non-charter code city.

Geography

Climate
According to the Köppen Climate Classification system, Mattawa has a semi-arid climate, abbreviated "BSk" on climate maps.

Demographics

The Mattawa Police Department (MAPD) currently consists of a police chief and four full-time, fully commissioned general authority Washington State police officers.

Mattawa is served by the Wahluke School District.

2010 census
As of the census of 2010, there were 4,437 people, 791 households, and 725 families residing in the town. The racial makeup of the town was 45.0% White, 0.9% African American, 1.1% Native American, 0.1% Asian, 49.7% from other races, and 3.4% from two or more races. Hispanic or Latino of any race were 95.7% of the population.

There were 791 households, of which 82.8% had children under the age of 18 living with them, 70.7% were married couples living together, 10.6% had a female householder with no husband present, 10.4% had a male householder with no wife present, and 8.3% were non-families. 2.3% of all households were made up of individuals, and 0.6% had someone living alone who was 65 years of age or older. The average household size was 5.61 and the average family size was 5.28.

The median age in the town was 22 years. 42% of residents were under the age of 18; 14.3% were between the ages of 18 and 24; 33.1% were from 25 to 44; 8.7% were from 45 to 64; and 1.8% were 65 years of age or older. The gender makeup of the town was 55.7% male and 44.3% female.

2000 census
As of the census of 2000, there were 2,609 people, 495 households, and 438 families residing in the town. The population density was 5,281.7 people per square mile (2,055.8/km2). There were 576 housing units at an average density of 1,166.1 per square mile (453.9/km2). The racial makeup of the town was 29.59% White, 0.19% African American, 0.54% Native American, 0.92% Asian, 65.85% from other races, and 2.91% from two or more races. Hispanic or Latino of any race were 89.80% of the population.

There were 495 households, out of which 66.7% had children under the age of 18 living with them, 64.2% were married couples living together, 10.7% had a female householder with no husband present, and 11.5% were non-families. 5.5% of all households were made up of individuals, and 2.0% had someone living alone who was 65 years of age or older. The average household size was 5.27 and the average family size was 4.79.

In the city, the population was spread out, with 38.1% under the age of 18, 20.4% from 18 to 24, 32.4% from 25 to 44, 7.6% from 45 to 64, and 1.5% who were 65 years of age or older. The median age was 22 years. For every 100 females, there were 151.8 males. For every 100 females age 18 and over, there were 179.2 males.

The median income for a household in the town was $31,964, and the median income for a family was $25,921. Males had a median income of $13,669 versus $13,333 for females. The per capita income for the city was $7,510. About 30.6% of families and 34.4% of the population were below the poverty line, including 38.0% of those under age 18 and 42.6% of those age 65 or over.

In popular culture
A place called Mattawa is mentioned in the Hank Snow adaptation of the Geoff Mack song "I've Been Everywhere", which was later covered by more than 130 artists including Johnny Cash.
A power plant in Mattawa is the setting for the ending of the first-season episode "E.B.E." of the TV show The X-Files.

References

External links

 The Royal Register - Local newspaper
 Mattawa Area News — Local newspaper
 Current articles, Mattawa Area News
 City website

Cities in Grant County, Washington
Cities in Washington (state)